Looie may refer to:

 Lou Carnesecca (born 1925), retired American college basketball coach
 Lieutenant, in military slang